The Secrets Tour was the debut concert tour by American pop/R&B singer Toni Braxton. The tour was in support of her album, Secrets. The tour began during the summer of 1996 in theatres. Jazz saxophonist Kenny G joined the tour September 18, 1996. Remaining shows in the U.S. were billed as An Evening with Kenny G & Toni Braxton.

Opening act
The Braxtons 
Kenny G

Setlist
This setlist is from the concert held at the United Center in Chicago, Illinois, January 18, 1997. It is not representative of all shows during the tour. 
"Overture"
"Seven Whole Days"
"Another Sad Love Song"
"Love Shoulda Brought You Home"
"There's No Me Without You"
"Talking In His Sleep" 
"Find Me a Man"
"I Love Me Some Him"
"Instrumental Sequence" (contains elements of "I Want You Back" / "Breakin' My Heart (Pretty Brown Eyes)" / "What Kind of Man Would I Be?")
"Breathe Again"
"You Mean the World to Me"
"Why Should I Care"
"Let It Flow"
"I Don't Want To"
"In the Late of Night"
"Come on Over Here"
"Dance Sequence"
"How Could an Angel Break My Heart" (performed with Kenny G)
Encore
"Un-Break My Heart"
"You're Makin' Me High"

Shows

Box office score data

Band
Musical Director: Bo Watson & Vance Taylor
Drums: Stokley Williams
Guitar: Homer O'Dell
Bass: Ricky Kinchen
Keyboards: Keri Lewis
Saxophone: Jeffrey Allen
Keyboards: Larry Waddell
Percussion: Chris Dave
Background vocals: Cha'n Andre', Dee Coupe, Valerie Davis, Julio Hanson, Dyron D. Wade, Gregory Ringo, Mario Johnson, Rodney Day, Gromyko Collins
Dancers: Rosero McCoy, Jamal Sims, Omar Lopez, Jermaine Montell

References

Toni Braxton concert tours
1997 concert tours